Ahlers is a surname. People with this surname include:

Anny Ahlers (1907–1933), German actress and singer
Daniel Ahlers (born 1973), Member of the South Dakota House of Representatives
Eleanor E. Ahlers (1911–1997), American librarian and educator
Emilio Ahlers (born 1942), Uruguayann rower
Friedrich Ahlers-Hestermann (1883–1973), German painter
Holton Ahlers (born 1999), American football quarterback
Jaco Ahlers (born 1982), South African golfer
John Ahlers, American sports announcer
José Ahlers (born 1941), Uruguayan rower
Keith Ahlers (born 1955), English racecar driver
Liesl Ahlers (born 1991), South African actress, director, singer, songwriter, martial artist
Marie Ahlers (1989–1968), German politician
Michael Ahlers (born 1973), German music educator
Ozzie Ahlers (born 1946), American songwriter and music producer
Ria Ahlers (born 1954), high jumper
Tommy Ahlers (born 1975), Danish businessman and politician